The Costa do Sol State Park (Sunshine Coast State Park) is a state park in the state of Rio de Janeiro, Brazil. It protects a number of fragments of coastal areas in the Atlantic Forest biome that are under intense pressure from urban expansion, but that also have considerable tourism potential.

Location

The Costa do Sol State Park has about  divided into four sectors, each consisting of one or more separate areas.
It covers lands in the municipalities of Araruama, Armação dos Búzios, Arraial do Cabo, Cabo Frio, Saquarema and São Pedro da Aldeia as well as parts of the Atlantic Ocean and the Araruama Lagoon in the state Rio de Janeiro. 
The Costa do Sol State Park is the first mosaic park in Brazil, made up of discontinuous protected areas.
In all there are 27 environmental preservation areas.

The unit protects almost all of the remaining natural ecosystems of the Região dos Lagos (Lake Region), which is under intense real estate pressure.
More than half of the park is located in the Massambaba Environmental Protection Area, which covers Saquarema, Araruama and Arraial do Cabo.
It contains several species in danger of extinction, including the passerine restinga antwren (Formicivora littoralis), rufous-legged owl (Strix rufipes), fluminense swallowtail (Parides ascanius) and skull tree iguana (Liolaemus occipitalis). 
There are vestiges of sambaquis, where prehistoric hunters and gatherers lived.
The Lagoa Vermelha, in Saquarema, contains limestone rocks formed by microorganisms in shallow seas and lagoons, a rare phenomenon that is important in understanding evolutionary history.

The park has considerable tourism potential, although as of 2015 little had been done to ensure that tourists would use the protected sites in a sustainable way.
The park rangers had fought 25 fires since the park was created, seized 18 irregular buildings, prevented seven attempts at logging and 12 squatter invasions and seized 15 wild animals.
However, the park did not have lodgings for park rangers or a visitor center.

History

Tourists have visited the area of the park for decades, attracted by the pristine beaches and lagoons, but it was being threatened by unplanned urban growth.
The state park was proposed by the Lagos São João Intermunicipal Consortium (CILSJ), a working group with representatives of municipalities, companies and civil society.
The park was created in a ceremony in Búzios attended by federal Environmental Minister Carlos Minc and state governor Sérgio Cabral Filho.

The objectives are to ensure preservation of remnants of Atlantic Forest and associate ecosystems of the coastal region, including restingas, mangroves, lagoons and swamps, to allow degraded areas to recover, to maintain populations of native fauna and flora as a refuge for rare, endemic or endangered species, to support recreation, education, scientific research, leisure and tourism, and to support sustainable economic activities in the park's surroundings.

In April 2015 the park promoted an annual promotion at Conchas Beach in Cabo Frio to encourage tourism and conservation in the park.
The program included an ecological race, stand-up paddle challenge, a workshop on reuse and customization of crates, garbage collection, interpretive tour and a music show. All the garbage was to be made into a sculpture.

Notes

Sources

State parks of Brazil
Protected areas established in 2011
2011 establishments in Brazil
Protected areas of Rio de Janeiro (state)